This article gives statistics of the Croatian First League in association football in the 1944 season.

First stage

City of Zagreb championship

Provincial Zagreb championship
1 : HSK Segesta Sisak

Zagreb play-offs
HSK Zeljeznicar Zagreb – HSK Segesta Sisak

City of Osijek championship
1 : HSK Gradjanski Osijek
2 : HSK Hajduk Osijek
3 : HSK Radnik Osijek
4 : HSK Olimpija Osijek
5 : HSK Graficar Osijek
6 : DSV Germania Osijek

Provincial Osijek championship
1 : HSK Borovo
2 : HSK Cibalia Vinkovci
3 : HSK Sparta Vukovar

Osijek play-offs

Round 1
HSK Gradjanski Osijek 7–0 ; ?-? HSK Sparta Vukovar
HSK Borovo 4–2 ; 0–1 HSK Cibalia Vinkovci

Round 2
HSK Hajduk Osijek 3–2 ; 0–2 HSK Radnik Osijek
HSK Borovo 2–1 ; ?-? HSK Gradjanski Osijek

Round 3
HSK Borovo 2–1 ; 0–0 HSK Radnik Osijek

City of Zemun championship
1 : HSK Dunav Zemun
2 : HSK Gradjanski Zemun
3 : SK Liet Zemun
4 : HSK Hajduk Zemun

Zemun play-offs
HSK Gradjanski Zemun – HSK Dunav Zemun

City of Banja Luka championship
1 : HBSK Banja Luka
2 : HSK Zvonimir Banja Luka
3 : HSK Hrvoje Banja Luka

City of Sarajevo
1 : SASK Sarajevo
2 : HSK Hajduk Sarajevo
3 : HSK Gjerzelez Sarajevo

Provincial Sarajevo
1 : HSK Tomislav Zenica

Sarajevo play-offs

Round 1
SASK Sarajevo – HSK Tomislav Zenica
HSK Gjerzelez Sarajevo – HSK Hajduk Sarajevo

Round 2
SASK Sarajevo – HSK Gjerzelez Sarajevo

Banja Luka / Sarajevo play-offs
SASK Sarajevo – HBSK Banja Luka

Second Stage

Group Zagreb

Group Provincial

Semifinals
HSK Gradjanski Zemun 0–2 ; 0–3 HSK Borovo

Finals
HSK Borovo 0–1 ; 0–3 SASK Sarajevo

Final
HASK Zagreb – SASK Sarajevo

References
rsssf

Croatian First league seasons
Croatia
Croatia
1